Rebecca Cole is an American musician who has played the keyboards in Wild Flag and the drums in The Minders. She is currently a touring member of Pavement, playing keyboards during their 2022-2023 reunion tour.

Regarding her role in Pavement's 2022-2023 reunion tour, the band's Bob Nastanovich noted: "[She] makes us better than ever, allowing us to play so many songs better than ever and also play 10-12 songs we’ve never played before. She makes us more versatile."

References

Year of birth missing (living people)
Living people
American rock keyboardists
Wild Flag members
The Minders members